Growth deals provide funds from the Government of the United Kingdom to local enterprise partnerships, for projects that benefit the local area and economy. They are promoted by the Ministry of Housing, Communities and Local Government, Department for Business, Energy and Industrial Strategy, Cabinet Office, and Department for Transport. They are collaboratively funded by local government.

Regional growth deals in Scotland are administered by the Scottish Government. Whereas in Wales, they are administered by regional economic boards.

History 

In 2020, a growth deal for North Wales was signed. 
They are also active in the Black Country.
In March 2021, a £450 million Growth Deal for the Borderlands was signed; affecting border counties of Cumbria and Northumberland.

List

See also 
Regional economy in Wales
Devolution in the United Kingdom
Economy of the United Kingdom
Levelling up policy of the Boris Johnson government
Local government in the United Kingdom
Localism Act 2011
Northern Powerhouse

References 

Local enterprise partnerships
Scottish Government
Department for Levelling Up, Housing and Communities
Department for Business, Energy and Industrial Strategy
Cabinet Office (United Kingdom)
Department for Transport
Economy of the United Kingdom

2020s in the United Kingdom